The European Communities (Finance) Act 2001 was an Act of the Parliament of the United Kingdom. It was given Royal Assent and became law on 4 December 2001, but was later repealed on 19 February 2008 by the European Communities (Finance) Act 2008.

Passage of the bill
The legislation was introduced to the House of Commons as the European Communities (Finance) Bill by the Chancellor of the Exchequer, Gordon Brown, on 21 June 2001. The Bill was read for the third time in the House of Commons on 18 October 2001 and passed to the House of Lords without a need for a vote. It was given Royal Assent and became law on 4 December 2001.

Effect of the Act
The Act passed into UK law the decisions on the European Union budget taken at the Council of Ministers meeting of 29 September 2000. It did this by amending the introductory paragraph of the European Communities Act 1972 to include reference to the 29 September 2000 decision. The Act superseded and repealed the European Communities (Finance) Act 1995, but was in turn repealed by the European Communities (Finance) Act 2008.

See also
 List of Acts of the Parliament of the United Kingdom relating to the European Communities / European Union

References

External links
theyworkforyou.com - Hansard records of Parliamentary debate relating to the Act

United Kingdom Acts of Parliament 2001
Repealed United Kingdom Acts of Parliament
Acts of the Parliament of the United Kingdom relating to the European Union
2001 in the European Union